Eggbuckland Community College is a coeducational secondary school and sixth form with academy status,  located in the Eggbuckland area of Plymouth, Devon, England. The school converted to academy status on 1 September 2013.

See also
List of schools in Plymouth

References

External links
Eggbuckland homepage

Secondary schools in Plymouth, Devon
Academies in Plymouth, Devon